The Human Development Index (HDI) is a summary measure of average achievement in key dimensions of human development: a long and healthy life, knowledge, and a decent standard of living. It is a standard means of measuring well-being. It is used to distinguish whether the country is a developed, developing, or underdeveloped country, and also to measure the impact of economic policies on quality of life. Countries fall into four broad categories based on their HDI: very high, high, medium, and low human development. Currently, Mauritius is the only African country that falls into the very high human development category.

List

The table below presents the latest Human Development Index (HDI) for countries in Africa as included in the United Nations Development Programme's Human Development Report, released on 8 September 2022 and based on data collected in 2021.

Almost all African UN member states, are included in the report. Several dependent territories administered by non-African states are also not ranked as they are not included in the latest report.

See also
 List of African countries by GDP (nominal)
 List of African countries by GDP (PPP)
 List of African countries by GDP (PPP) per capita
 List of African countries by population
 List of countries by Human Development Index
 List of countries by Human Development Index by region
 List of countries by percentage of population living in poverty
 Poverty in Africa

References

<https://worldpopulationreview.com/country-rankings/most-developed-countries-in-africa</ref>

Human Development Index
Human Development Index
Africa